Bir Uttom is the second highest award for individual gallantry in Bangladesh after the Bir Sreshtho and the highest gallantry award for a living individual.

Since the independence of Bangladesh in 1971, 69 people have been awarded the Bir Uttom.

Recipients
This award was declared on 15 December 1973. A total of 67 people have been rewarded for their bravery and dedication in the liberation war of Bangladesh in 1971.

Lieutenant G. M. Mushfiqur Rahman Bir Uttam (1966-1989) was posted in 1 Field Artillery Regiment of Bangladesh Army in the Chittagong Hill Tracts. On 8 September 1989, he led a 17 member team of Bangladesh Army soldiers and attacked a terrorist Shanti Bahini camp. Lieutenant Rahman was injured during the clash and he died on 8 September 1989 at 8.15 am. He was posthumously awarded Bir Uttom award. 

In April 2010, Brigadier General Jamil Uddin Ahmad was posthumously conferred with the Bir Uttom for being the only army officer present and who was killed while trying to counter the successful assassination attempt on President Sheikh Mujibur Rahman on 15 August 1975.

The following list has been prepared from the Bangladesh Gazette of 15 December 1973:

Bangladesh Army

Bangladesh Navy

Bangladesh Air Force

Civilians

Post 1971

See also
 Bir Shreshtho
 Bir Bikrom
 Bir Protik

References

Military awards and decorations of Bangladesh